Irakli Goginashvili (born 29 March 1994) is a Georgian football midfielder who most recently played for FC Shevardeni-1906 Tbilisi.

Career
Born in Tbilisi, Georgia, Goginashvili started playing with FC Metalurgi Rustavi in the 2013–14 Umaglesi Liga. Next season he moved abroad to Moldova where he joined FC Saxan playing in the Moldovan National Division.  The following summer, more precisely in June 2015, he left Moldova and signed with FK Novi Pazar playing in the Serbian SuperLiga. However at the end of the month Milorad Kosanović was dismissed as main coach and replaced by Petar Kurčubić which had a different concept for the team, and by August 14, 2015, Goginashvili was released by Novi Pazar and he resigned with FC Saxan. He played the first half of the 2015–16 Moldovan National Division with Saxan, and during winter-brak he returned home to Georgia by joining the top level side FC Sioni Bolnisi.

Club statistics
Total matches played in Moldavian First League: 25 matches - 4 goals

References

1994 births
Living people
People from Rustavi
Footballers from Georgia (country)
Association football midfielders
FC Metalurgi Rustavi players
FC Saxan players
Expatriate footballers in Moldova
FK Novi Pazar players
Expatriate footballers in Serbia